Arne Lietz (born 23 July 1976) is a German politician who served Member of the European Parliament (MEP) for Germany from 2014 until 2019. He is a member of the Social Democratic Party, part of the Party of European Socialists.

Early life and career
Lietz studied History, Politics and Education at the Humboldt University of Berlin and the University of Cape Town in South Africa. He graduated with a master's degree in History. From 2004–2006 Lietz was the European representative of the American charity Facing History and Ourselves which develops educational material on injustice and prejudice throughout history, with a particular focus on The Holocaust. During his time at the charity he worked in Berlin, Boston and London. He later worked as a parliamentary assistant, a script-writer and a washer-up.

Parliamentary service
Member, Committee on Development (2014–2019)
Member, Committee on Foreign Affairs (2014–2019)
Member, Delegation for relations with Israel (2014–2019)
Member, Delegation for relations with the Korean Peninsula (2015–2019)

In addition to his committee assignments, Lietz served as a member of the European Parliament Intergroup on Western Sahara.

Other activities
 Energy Watch Group (EWG), Member
 German War Graves Commission, Member of the Parliamentary Advisory Board
 Atlantik-Brücke, Member
 Tönissteiner Kreis, Member
 German United Services Trade Union (ver.di), Member

Personal life
Lietz lives in Wittenberg.

References

Living people
1976 births
German expatriates in the United States
Humboldt University of Berlin alumni
Social Democratic Party of Germany MEPs
MEPs for Germany 2014–2019
People from Güstrow
University of Cape Town alumni